Attila Csamangó is a Hungarian sprint canoer who has competed since the mid first decade of the 21st century. He won two medals in the K-4 500 m at the ICF Canoe Sprint World Championships with a silver in 2006 and a bronze in 2007.

References

Hungarian male canoeists
Living people
Year of birth missing (living people)
ICF Canoe Sprint World Championships medalists in kayak
21st-century Hungarian people